The Texas Instruments AR7 or TI-AR7 is a fully integrated single-chip ADSL CPE access router solution. The AR7 combines a MIPS32 processor, a DSP-based digital transceiver, and an ADSL analog front end.

Ownership history 
In 2007, TI sold its DSL business to Infineon.

In 2009, Infineon Technologies spins off its wireline division to Lantiq.

On November 6, 2009, Lantiq announced that it became a standalone company.

Features 
 Integrated high performance MIPS 4KEc 32-Bit RISC processor
 ADSL PHY subsystem based on TI C62x DSP, with integrated transceiver, codec, line driver, and line receiver
 Hardware accelerated ATM Segmentation and Reassembly (SAR)
 Integrated IEEE 802.3 PHY
 Two IEEE 802.3 MACs with integrated Media Independent Interface (MII) and Quality of Service (QoS)
 Integrated USB 1.1 compliant transceiver (slave only)
 Two VLYNQ interfaces for compatible high-speed expansion devices
 Two 16c550 compatible UARTs
 EJTAG, GPIO and "Flexible Serial Interface" (FSER) interfaces
 4 KiB PROM (0xBFC00000) and 4KiB RAM (0x80000000) on the chip for boot purposes
 Physical package of a 324 BGA with 1.0-mm ball pitch

Options 
 AR7DB
 AR7RD
 AR7WRD (TNETD7300GDU) is an AR7 option with an interface for WiFi card.
 AR7VWI : DSL + VoIP + Wireless
 AR7VW
 AR7WI
 AR7V : DSL + VoIP
 The Adam2 bootloader
 The Pspboot bootloader

Devices based on the Texas Instruments AR7
 Actiontec GT701
 Acorp W400G/W422G
 Asus AAM6010EV : TNETD7300GDU, 2Mb FLASH, 8Mb SDRAM
 AVM Fritz!Box
 Aztech DSL-600E: 2Mb FLASH, 8Mb SDRAM
 Aztech DSL600ER: 2Mb FLASH, 8Mb SDRAM, 88E6060 Switch
 Aztech DSL600EW: 4Mb FLASH, 16Mb SDRAM, 88E6060 Switch, TNETW1130
 D-Link DSL-xxxT (like 300T)
 D-Link DVA-G3342SB (DSL board only)
 ECI B-FOCuS combo 352+, B-FOCuS Router 312+A
 devolo dsl+ 1100 duo, dsl+ 1100 LAN
 Efficient Networks, Inc / ENI SpeedStream 5100
 Huawei WA1003A
 LevelOne FBR-1416A: 2Mb FLASH, 8Mb SDRAM, 88E6060 Switch
 Linksys ADSL2MUE 4MB Flash, 16MB ram, USB + 1 Ethernet only
 Linksys AG241
 Linksys WAG200Gv1
 Linksys WAG54Gv2 and v3
 Linksys WAG354Gv1, v2, and v2.1
 Linksys HG200
 Netgear DG834(G) (Version 1, 2, and 3 have AR7 Chipset; version 4 has Broadcom chipset)
 Paradyne (Zhone Technologies) Hotwire 6210-A2, 6211-A2, and 6381-A2 (OEM Asus AAM6010EV)
 Pluscom AWR-7200
 Safecom SWART2-54125
 Shiro DSL805(E/EU/EW)
 Siemens SX541 uses real-time OS (SOHO.BIN) and BRN Boot Loader from the Broad Net Technology, Inc.
 Siemens SpeedStream 4100/4200/5620/SE567
 Sitecom WL-108
 Surecom 9410SX-g
 Solwise ADSL-SAR-600E/SAR600EW/SAR605EW
 Sphairon Turbolink JDR454WB WLAN ADSL Modem (2548 937939)
 T-Com Sinus 154 DSL SE
 T-Com Sinus 154 DSL Basic SE
 T-Com Sinus 154 DSL Basic 3
 T-Com Speedport W501V
 T-Com Speedport W701V
 TRENDnet TEW-435BRM v1
 Westell WireSpeed 2000 and ProLine 6100
 ZyXEL Prestige 660 Series ADSL 2+ Modem/Router - Prestige 660M-67 (Arcor-DSL Speed-Modem 50Z)
 3Com Officeconnect 3crwdr100x series 3Com 3rcwdr100x series ADSL firewall router

Third-party firmware
 RouterTech has released open source firmware.
 OpenWrt has open source firmware in development, available for testing.
 DGTeam

References

External links 
 www.lantiq.com – Lantiq XWAY™ AR7
 linux-mips.org – AR7 wiki
 ar7.wikispaces.com – AR7 wiki
 wehavemorefun.de – Fritz!Box Wiki

AR7
MIPS architecture
Digital subscriber line